Dyn'Aéro was a light aircraft manufacturing company based in Pau, France.

History

Dyn'Aéro was founded in October 1992 at Darois, France by the team of three who built the first CR100, with CEO Christophe Robin.

The company was notable for its MCR series of factory built and homebuilt aircraft such as the two seat Dyn'Aéro MCR01. Dyn'Aéro aircraft are all-composite, carbon fibre, light aircraft based on the aluminum Colomban MC-100 original design of Michel Colomban. The aircraft were supplied either as an amateur-built kit or, optionally, ready-built, where local regulations allowed.

The company went bankrupt in January 2012 and was sold to Groupe AK on 1 March 2012.

The company relocated from Darois to Pau in August 2013 but ceased its activities in 2017.

Aircraft

 Dyn'Aéro MCR01 (ULC in ultralight category)
 Dyn'Aéro MCR4S (Pick Up in ultralight category)
 Dyn'Aéro CR.100
 Dyn'Aéro CR.110
 Dyn'Aéro CR.120
 Dyn'Aéro R180
 Dyn'Aéro Twin-R

References

External links 
 
 SE Aviation (in French)

Defunct aircraft manufacturers of France
Manufacturing companies established in 1992
French companies established in 1992
2012 mergers and acquisitions
Manufacturing companies disestablished in 2017
French companies disestablished in 2017